M.F. Horn 4&5: Live at Jimmy's is the 6th big band album by Canadian jazz trumpeter Maynard Ferguson for Columbia Records. Live at Jimmy's was recorded during a lunchtime event, where members of the press and record company executives were invited to hear Maynard and his band play a special two-hour mid-day concert.

Background
During the 1973 Newport Jazz Festival (which had been moved to New York City the year before), Maynard and his band were playing a series of dates at Jimmy Ryan's jazz club on West 52nd street. After recording Ella Fitzgerald's performance for the festival at Carnegie Hall, producer Teo Macero and music critic Mort Goode went over to Jimmy's to catch Maynard's set later that evening, along with a handful of Columbia Records executives. Due to the excitement of the performance and the quality of the venue, it was quickly decided that this needed to be captured for a live album.

Reviews

Live at Jimmy's was well received by fans and critics alike. According to Scott Yanow at AllMusic, "This double LP is easily Maynard Ferguson's best jazz-oriented recording for Columbia."

Reissues
In 2007, M.F. Horn 4&5: Live at Jimmy's was reissued by Wounded Bird Records.

Track listing

Credits 
Musicians
 Maynard Ferguson: Trumpet
 Trumpets & Flugelhorn: Lin Biviano, Danny Cahn, John de Flon, Bob Summers
 Trombones: Randy Purcell, Graham Ellis
 Alto & soprano saxophone & flute: Andy MacIntosh
 Tenor sax & flute: Ferdinand Povel
 Baritone sax & flute: Bruce Johnstone
 Drums: Randy Jones
 Bass / Fender bass: Rick Petrone
 Electric piano: Pete Jackson

Production
 Producer: Teo Macero
 Engineer: Russ Payne 
 Re-Mix Engineer: Stan Tonkel
 Mastering Engineer: Jack Ashkinazy

References

External links
 

1974 albums
Albums produced by Teo Macero
Big band albums
Columbia Records albums
Maynard Ferguson albums